Firouz Karimi (born 12 April 1956) is an Iranian football coach.

Early life
Firouz Karimi was born on 13 April 1958 in Tehran, Iran.

Playing career
He began playing football in Shahrbani F.C. in 1970 and joined Pas Tehran in 1976. He won the Takht Jamshid Cup twice with Pas. He left Pas in 1981 and joined Sarbaz but returned to Pas in 1984. He was also invited to the Iran national football team in 1980 but never played for the national team. He retired in 1984.

Coaching career
He was selected as head coach of Pas Tehran in 1989. He could bring the team from 2nd Division to the Azadegan League in 1990. He won the 1991–92 and 1992–93 seasons and brought the Asian Club Championship for the team in 1993. He resigned after it and was appointed as Sepahan head coach later. He was sacked by the club in 1994 and became the head coach of Bahman going on to win the Hazfi Cup one year later. He was re-appointed as head coach of Pas in 1996 for one season. After these events, Polyacryl Esfahan signed a contract with Karimi but resigned after bad results. He was also head coach of Tabriz based Tractor Sazi from 1998 to 1999. He became head coach of Esteghlal Ahvaz in 1999 and led the team until 2000. He was manager of Aboomoslem for just six months in 2000 and was again selected to be Esteghlal Ahvaz's head coach in 2001. He resigned as head coach Esteghlal Ahvaz to become the head coach of PAS for a third spell. Shahab Zanjan and Aboomoslem was his next teams. He was appointed as Rah Ahan head coach in June 2004. He led the team in two seasons and was sacked in February 2006. He was again appointed as Esteghlal Ahvaz head coach in June 2006. After the resignation of Nasser Hejazi as head coach of Esteghlal, he became head coach of Esteghlal in November 2007 who, under his management, were ranked 13th. This was regarded as a bad result for the team in the history of Esteghlal. He resigned in May 2008 and was appointed as head coach of Saba Battery in July 2008. He was sacked by the club in June 2009. After it he signed a contract with Azadegan League side Damash Gilan in July 2009 but resigned after the team failed to get promoted to the Iran Pro League in the play-off. He became head coach of Shahin Bushehr on 6 October 2011 after Hamid Derakhshan's departure. He led the Shahin to the final of the 2011–12 Hazfi Cup but, after bad results in the league, he was fired by the club. On 27 January 2013, he became head coach of Paykan but his side was relegated to the Azadegan League at the end of the season.

In May 2013, Karimi was fired by Paykan and was replaced by Farhad Kazemi. Subsequently he was named as manager of Zob Ahan. He saved the club from relegation, however, he left the club at the end of the season after not agreeing on a new contract. On 6 December 2014, Karimi became head coach of Malavan.

Statistics

Honours

As player
Pas Tehran
Takht Jamshid Cup (2): 1976–77, 1977–78

As manager
Pas Tehran
Iran Pro League (2): 1991–92, 1992–93 
Asian Club Championship (1): 1993

Bahman
Hazfi Cup (1): 1994–95

References

External links

 Firouz Karimi at Soccerway
 Firouz Karimi on Instagram

Iranian footballers
Iranian football managers
Living people
Sepahan S.C. managers
Esteghlal F.C. managers
Damash Gilan managers
1956 births
Paykan F.C. managers
Tractor S.C. managers
Saba Qom F.C. managers
Association football defenders
Sanat Naft Abadan F.C. managers
Persian Gulf Pro League managers
Shahin Bushehr F.C. managers
Malavan F.C. managers